Yassin Mohamed (born 4 April 1996 in France) is a French footballer who now plays for Lorca in Spain.

Career
Mohamed started his senior career with RC Lens. In 2013, he signed for Royal Excel Mouscron in the Belgian First Division B, where he made four league appearances and scored zero goals. After that, he played for S.V. Zulte Waregem, Córdoba CF, R.F.C. Tournai, Penya Encarnada d'Andorra, Almagro CF, and Lorca, where he now plays.

References

External links 
 Yassin Mohamed: "Andorra is an interesting championship" 
 Yassin Mohamed: "I enjoyed my adventure with RC Lens" 
 "Continue to progress"
 Foot: Yassin Mohamed, a Tercera Division player from the Spanish championship
 Yassin Mohamed on the revival 
 Yassin Mohamed (ex Lens) "Open to any project"
 Yassin Mohamed: "My experience at RC Lens marked me as a man and a player"
 Yassin Mohamed: “La Botola? Of course that might interest me"
 Interview: Yassin Mohamed, RC Lens 
 FM info: zoom on Yassin Mohamed, this hope who left Lens 
 Yassin Mohamed: "I would like to play for my Country" 
 This Arrageois had to evolve with Djibril Cissé but "We were sold a project that was nothing but dust"

1996 births
Living people
French footballers
RC Lens players
Royal Excel Mouscron players
S.V. Zulte Waregem players
Córdoba F.C. players
R.F.C. Tournai players
Club Almagro players
Lorca FC players
Association football defenders